Florin Ionel Cornelaș Bătrînu (born 19 March 1971), known as Florin Bătrînu, is a Romanian former professional footballer who played as a defender or midfielder. In his almost 20 years of career Bătrînu played for teams such as: CFR Timișoara, Politehnica Timișoara, Național București, Dinamo București or Budapest Honvéd, among others.

He is currently the assistant coach for the Romanian Women's International Football Team.

Honours

Player 
 FC Politehnica Timișoara
 Cupa României: Runner-up 1991–92

 FC Universitatea Craiova
 Cupa României: Runner-up 1999–2000

 Berliner FC Dynamo
 NOFV-Oberliga: Winner 2000–01

References

External links 
 
 
 
 

Living people
1971 births
People from Oravița
Romanian footballers
Association football defenders
Association football midfielders
Liga I players
FC Politehnica Timișoara players
FC Progresul București players
FC Dinamo București players
FC U Craiova 1948 players
Liga II players
FC CFR Timișoara players
Oberliga (football) players
Berliner FC Dynamo players
Nemzeti Bajnokság I players
Budapest Honvéd FC players
Romanian expatriate footballers
Romanian expatriate sportspeople in Germany
Expatriate footballers in Germany
Romanian expatriate sportspeople in Hungary
Expatriate footballers in Hungary
Romania international footballers
Romanian football managers
CSC Dumbrăvița managers